Counts of Falkenstein may refer to:
Counts of Falkenstein (Bavaria)
Counts of Falkenstein (Rhineland-Palatinate)